Hector Chotteau (24 May 1898 – 1 December 1985) was a Belgian ice hockey player. He won two medals at the Ice Hockey European Championships in 1924 and 1927, and finished fifth at the 1928 Winter Olympics.

References

1898 births
1985 deaths
Ice hockey players at the 1928 Winter Olympics
Olympic ice hockey players of Belgium
People from Laeken
Sportspeople from Brussels
Belgian ice hockey goaltenders